Shamli railway station is a main railway station in Shamli district, Uttar Pradesh. Its code is SMQL. It serves Shamli city. The station consists of three platforms. The platforms are not well sheltered. It lacks many facilities including water and sanitation.

Trains 

Some of the trains that runs from Shamli are :

 Bikaner–Haridwar Special Fare Special
 Haridwar–Ajmer Express
 Saharanpur–Farukhnagar Janta Express (UP- 14545, Down- 14546)
 Shamli Delhi Passenger 
 Shamli Delhi DEMU Passenger
 Shamli Saharanpur Passenger

References

Railway stations in Shamli district
Delhi railway division
Shamli